National Highway 137, commonly referred to as NH 137 is a national highway in  India. It is a spur road of National Highway 37. NH-137 traverses the state of Manipur in India.

Route 
Rengpang, Khongsang, Tamenglong

Junctions  

  Terminal near Rengpang.

See also 

 List of National Highways in India by highway number
 List of National Highways in India by state

References

External links 

 NH 137 on OpenStreetMap

National highways in India
National Highways in Manipur